The Lebaishi Cup (Traditional:樂百氏杯; Simplified: 乐百氏杯; Pinyin: Lèbǎishì Bēi) is a Zhongguo Qiyuan Go competition.

Outline 
The Lebaishi Cup is sponsored by the Robust Incorporated. The winner's purse is 128,000 CY ($15,600).

the Robust Incorporated is a Guangdong-based drink company. It was a local milk-production company in Guangdong, before it was purchased by French company Danone in the early 2000.

Past winners

Lebaishi Cup